James Rashad Coleman is an American politician serving as a member of the Colorado Senate from the 33rd district. He was previously a member of the Colorado House of Representatives.

Early life and education 
He was born and raised in Park Hill, Denver. He earned a Bachelor of Arts degree in psychology with a minor in business administration from Oral Roberts University.

Career
Coleman was elected to the Colorado House of Representatives in 2016. He won the Democratic primary with 41.37% of the vote against opponents Michele Wheeler and Elet Valentine and ran unopposed in the general election. During his tenure in the House, Coleman served on the Business Affairs & Labor Committee and the House Local Government Committee.

In 2019, Coleman announced his candidacy for the 33rd district seat in the Colorado Senate. Coleman ran unopposed in the Democratic primary and defeated Unionist Party nominee Jerry Burton in the November general election. He assumed office on January 13, 2021.

Personal life 
Coleman lives in Denver's Green Valley Ranch neighborhood. He and his wife, Shayna, have two children.

References

External links
Official campaign website

21st-century African-American politicians
21st-century American politicians
African-American state legislators in Colorado
Democratic Party Colorado state senators
Democratic Party members of the Colorado House of Representatives
Living people
Oral Roberts University alumni
Politicians from Denver
Year of birth missing (living people)